QMobile (Urdu:) was a Pakistani consumer electronics marketing company which marketed Gionee smartphones in Pakistan. At its peak, it was one of the largest smartphone marketing brand in Pakistan with an estimate of one million mobile phones sold monthly. QMobile Phone's are assembled in Pakistan with basic parts imported from vendors in China and sold under its own brand.

History
QMobile was launched in 2009. Its mobile phones were known for their low- and mid-ranged smart and mobile phones and were assembled with imported part from China.

QMobile’s range of devices includes some tablets and dozens of phones including touchscreen, QWERTY, and WiFi, all running Android OS. A windows phone named QMobile W1 was also launched in 2015. QMobile launched the first Android One smartphone in Pakistan. 
With the passage of time Qmobile has lost its popularity and eventually its market share to other brands. But in August 2020 it made a return with View Max series, which gained significant popularity in Pakistan.

Branding 
QMobile appointed Ertugrul Ghazi famed Esra Bilgic as its Brand Ambassador for their View Max series.

References

External links
 

Mobile phone companies of Pakistan
Pakistani brands
2009 establishments in Pakistan
Electronics companies established in 2009
Companies based in Karachi
Privately held companies of Pakistan